Andrew Henry Lynch (1792 – 13 July 1847) was an Irish barrister and a Repeal Association MP.

He was the only son of Patrick Lynch and Jane Kelly of Strokestown. He owned the townlands of Lydacan and Lisswulla in Claregalway.

In 1810, he graduated from Trinity College Dublin with a BA was called to the English Bar at the Middle Temple on 21 January 1818.

Blake became Repeal Association Member of Parliament (MP) for Galway Borough in 1833, alongside Lachlan MacLachlan, and held the seat until the 1841 general election, when he did not seek re-election.

In 1838, he was appointed a Master in Chancery in England.

He married Theresa Butler (d. 1863), daughter of Charles Butler.

He died at Tournai on 13 July 1847.

References

External links
 

1792 births
1847 deaths
Irish Repeal Association MPs
Members of the Parliament of the United Kingdom for County Galway constituencies (1801–1922)
UK MPs 1832–1835
UK MPs 1835–1837
UK MPs 1837–1841